The 2000 Campeonato Mineiro was the 86th edition of the state championship of Minas Gerais organized by the FMF. The competition began on 23 January and ended on 8 June 2000.

The competition was won by Atlético Mineiro winning their 38th Campeonato Mineiro and their second in a row after winning the 1999 competition. The final consisted of a 2–1 win over Cruzeiro in the first leg followed by a 1–1 draw in the second leg.

Format

First stage
The 2000 Módulo I first stage was contested by 8 clubs in a double round-robin tournament. The four best-placed teams qualified for the second stage and the bottom two teams were relegated to the 2001 Módulo II. The winner of the first stage is named champion of the Taça Minas Gerais.

Second stage
The four teams that qualified from the first stage were entered into a second, double round-robin tournament, alongside four teams that received byes from the first stage. The clubs that received first stage byes were: América Mineiro, Atlético Mineiro, Cruzeiro and Villa Nova.

Finals
The finals were played between the 2 best-placed teams from the second stage in a two-legged tie.

Participating teams

First stage

Second stage

Finals

Atlético Mineiro win 3–2 on aggregate

References

Campeonato Mineiro seasons
2000 in Brazilian football
Mineiro